Erin Hills is a golf course in the north central United States, located in Erin, Wisconsin,  in Washington County,  northwest of Milwaukee. The course officially opened in 2006. It hosted the 117th U.S. Open in 2017. The announcement was made in 2010. It was the first USGA regular men's event ever awarded to a course owned by an individual.  The 2011 U.S. Amateur, won by Kelly Kraft, was also held at Erin Hills.

History
Erin Hills was built by Wisconsin developer Bob Lang, who used his own money to fund the course. Designers included Dr. Michael John Hurdzan and his business partner Dana Fry, and Ron Whitten.  Determined to bring the U.S. Open to Erin Hills and at the suggestion of USGA officials, Lang made many changes to the layout of the course, dramatically changing several holes.  Lang's ultimate goal of bringing the U.S. Open forced him to sell the course, due to financial 

Andrew Ziegler purchased the course in 2009; as part of his commitment to upgrading the conditioning of the golf course, he said that Erin Hills would be operated on a "walking-only" basis starting in 2010. Unlike most modern courses, Erin Hills was not outfitted with paved cart paths.

Grounds
The course includes a manor home specifically built as a hotel that includes a pub, and a refurbished barn available for private events.  The grounds have been upgraded to include cottages for overnight stay. About  to the east on higher ground is the landmark Holy Hill shrine, visible from 

Erin Hills' Irish-themed clover was inspired by the old bell on the course imported from Europe. Each petal was inspired from the iron art on the bell. The logo was designed by Brenda Williams, a competitive golfer from Minnetrista, Minnesota.

Major tournaments hosted

Scorecard

Source:

Video
You Tube – 2011 U.S. Amateur at Erin Hills recap

References

External links

1999 establishments in Wisconsin
Buildings and structures in Washington County, Wisconsin
Golf clubs and courses in Wisconsin
Sports in the Milwaukee metropolitan area
Sports venues completed in 1999
Tourist attractions in Washington County, Wisconsin